Steveniella is a genus of flowering plants from the orchid family, Orchidaceae. Only one species is known, Steveniella satyrioides, native to Iran, Turkey, Crimea and the Caucasus.

Steveniella satyrioides is considered an endangered species in Armenia.

See also 
 List of Orchidaceae genera

References

External links 

Swiss Orchid Foundation at the Herbarium Jany Renz, Steveniella satyrioides 
Orchids of Europe photographic archives, Steveniella satyrioides 
Orchidea Klub Brno, Steveniella satyrioides

Monotypic Orchidoideae genera
Orchideae genera
Orchideae
Orchids of Russia
Orchids of Asia
Flora of Iran

de:Kappenorchis